The Eastern Caribbean Securities Exchange (ECSE) is the first regional securities market in the Western Hemisphere and a regional Stock exchange, established by the Eastern Caribbean Central Bank (ECCB) to serve the eight member territories of Anguilla, Antigua and Barbuda, Dominica, Grenada, Montserrat, Saint Kitts and Nevis, Saint Lucia, and Saint Vincent and the Grenadines. Its headquarters are located in the city of Basseterre, on the island of St. Kitts.

See also 

 Eastern Caribbean Central Securities Registry
 List of stock exchanges in the Commonwealth of Nations
 List of stock exchanges in the United Kingdom, the British Crown Dependencies and United Kingdom Overseas Territories
 Dutch Caribbean Securities Exchange

External links 
 

Securities Exchange
Stock exchanges in the Caribbean
Organisation of Eastern Caribbean States